Lynne Hamilton (born 1950) is an English-born singer, notable for her career in Australia, particularly during the 1970s and 1980s having recorded the single "On the Inside", the theme to the television series  Prisoner.

Early life and career
Hamilton was born 1950 in Lancashire, England, the eldest of four children to Reg Hamilton and his wife. Her career as a singer began as a teenager when she joined a backing group The Desperadoes. They appeared on the same bill as acts such as The Rolling Stones, The Who, Freddy and the Dreamers and The Animals. She knew the Beatles personally, having been signed with the same record labels and having been on the same TV shows and at the same parties and social promotional events for the record label for four years. She later had a four-year stint as a singer with The Caravelles, who successfully toured in the UK and across Europe. In 1971, Hamilton moved to Australia where she variously owned and operated a car hire company, lingerie business and restaurants.

In 1979 Hamilton was invited to sing "On the Inside", written by Allan Caswell as the theme tune for Australian soap opera, "Prisoner". The song was released as a single in Australia, reaching number 4 in the singles chart and selling in excess of 70,00 and became Australia's largest selling single by a female artist. The song was also released in the United States by Hilltak Records.

Ten years after this initial success, the song was issued in the UK for the first time, to coincide with the series' first broadcast on UK television. It reached number three on UK singles charts. Hamilton performed the song on Top of the Pops.

In 1989, Hamilton released "In Your Arms (Love song from Neighbours)" for the Australian soap opera Neighbours.

Discography

Albums

Singles

References

External links
 Forerunners International Ministries
 Prisoner fan site (with biography and quotes)
 Caravelles biography

English evangelicals
English Christians
English women pop singers
Musicians from Lancashire
Living people
1950 births
Hilltak Records artists